The United States Census Bureau separates places by incorporation for statistical purposes during its decennial census. To incorporate, communities may need to meet statutory requirements made by their respective state, such as thresholds in population or specificities relative to location. Federally, the Census Bureau defines incorporated places as areas, whose boundaries do not cross state lines, that "provide governmental functions for a concentration of people", as opposed to "minor civil [divisions], which generally ... provide services or administer an area without regard, necessarily, to population". Unincorporated communities, classified as census-designated places (CDPs), lack elected municipal officers and boundaries with legal status. The Bureau identified 169 CDPs in the state of West Virginia at the 2010 census.

Applicant areas must not reside within a municipality "urban in character", nor claim an area "disproportionate to its number of inhabitants". Upon approval, the state classifies municipal corporations as a Class I city, with a population of more than fifty thousand, a Class II city, with a population between ten thousand and fifty thousand, a Class III city, with a population between two thousand and ten thousand, or a Class IV town or village, with a population of less than two thousand. All municipalities can "use a common seal", defend, maintain, or institute a proceeding in court, and hold, take, purchase, or lease, as lessee, property for municipal purposes.

Of the fifty-five counties in West Virginia, Logan is home to the most CDPs, with twenty-two, followed by Fayette, with eighteen, and Raleigh, with fifteen.

Census-designated places

See also
 List of cities in West Virginia
 List of towns in West Virginia
 List of villages in West Virginia

Explanatory notes

References

Census-designated places in West Virginia
Census-designated places in West Virginia, List of
West Virginia